St. Brother André Catholic High School is a Catholic secondary school in Markham, Ontario, Canada. Grades 9 to 12 are taught, with religious studies included in the curriculum. It is named after Saint André Bessette (also known as Brother André), a 20th-century Catholic religious brother in Montreal responsible for the construction of the Saint Joseph's Oratory.

Brother André is located in east-central Markham, and its feeder schools include
St. Kateri Tekakwitha CES
San Lorenzo Ruiz Catholic Elementary School
St. Edward CES
St. Joseph CES (Markham)
St. Julia Billiart CES
St. Justin Martyr (Markham)
St. Patrick CES (Markham)
St. Mark CES (Stouffville)
St. Brigid CES (Stouffville)
St. Brendan CES (Stouffville)

Councils
St. Brother André CHS is composed of six student government councils each with a president and two vice presidents. The president and the vice presidents of each student council create the student government body. The student government body meets once a month to discuss council-run events and plan for upcoming school events.

The six student government councils are as follows:

Student Council

The council focuses on the involvement of the students in the St. Brother Andre CHS community. Student council puts on numerous events throughout the year.

Events run by Student council include: Halloween Costume Contest, Scare Cam, Bring Your Own Mug, Ugly Christmas Sweater Day, Christmas Karaoke, All Grades Dance, Semi-Formal, and SBA Day.

Faith Development Council

The Faith Development Council, also known as FDC, is a student-run council in St. Brother Andre CHS at the service of God and the Catholic Church. Formally established in the 2014-2015 school year, FDC has student evangelization and outreach at its heart. FDC is affiliated with the school chaplaincy and also assists in the maintenance of the school chapel, dedicated to St. Joseph. Unlike the other school councils, FDC has an open membership policy.

Arts Council
Arts Council's annual events include Pumpkin Carving, Art Attack and Arts Night.

Athletic Council

Athletic council is a student council composed of students with a passion for athletics. These students help behind the scenes in the school's sporting endeavors. Students help to time keep, score keep, and take pictures of the school's teams at home games.

Athletic council's two main annual events are Cardinal Games and Athletic Banquet. The Cardinal Games engages the special needs department in an afternoon full of fun and athletics. The annual Athletic Banquet recognizes athletes from the school's different sports teams and recognizes the Most Valuable Player (MVP) and Most Improved (MIP) of each team.

Luke 4:18

The Luke 4:18 Social Justice Committee is a student council run at St. Brother André CHS that focuses on the less fortunate and giving back to the community.

OSAID

Ontario Students Against Impaired Driving (OSAID) organizes events year round to create awareness about the effects of impaired driving. These events include; Drug Awareness Week, and the yearly MADD presentation showed to students and staff.

Powersource

Protecting Our World by Eliminating Racism (Powersource) is a council that aims to enlighten students about the negative effects of racism and how as a student body they can help put an end to it. "Powersource is a council which ... promotes diversity within our school environment"

Powersource's annual events include Fusion, and Taste of the World. Fusion is a talent and fashion show put on every year by students. This helps demonstrate to student's different traditional cultural dances and clothing items. Taste of the World gives students the opportunity to purchase food dishes from different cultures prepared by students of the community.

Academics  
St. Brother André has implemented an Advanced Placement program that offers Pre-AP courses to grade 9, 10, 11 students that have been identified as gifted or are academically strong in the subject field. Pre-AP courses are offered in the core subjects of Math, English, Science, and Social Sciences.  Grade 12 students are offered full AP courses as well.

Fire
On April 28, 2010, a fire broke out at St. Brother André Catholic High School in the boys' washroom on the second floor. One person was treated for smoke inhalation and personal anxiety. Former principal Jim Nicoletti said that there was a "minor" investigation in progress by the York Regional Police.

Notable alumni
Steven Stamkos, professional ice hockey centre and team captain for the Tampa Bay Lightning of the National Hockey League (NHL)
Michael Del Zotto, professional ice hockey defenseman for the Anaheim Ducks of the National Hockey League (NHL)
Mena Massoud, actor who played Aladdin in Disney's live-action remake of Aladdin.
Andrew Lue, former professional football player for the Montreal Alouettes of the Canadian Football League (CFL)

See also

List of high schools in Ontario

References

York Catholic District School Board
High schools in the Regional Municipality of York
Catholic secondary schools in Ontario
Educational institutions established in 1984
1984 establishments in Ontario